Hakkenden, and variations, may refer to:

 Nansō Satomi Hakkenden, an epic 19th century serial novel by Kyokutei Bakin

Or adaptations of the story, including:
 Satomi Hakkenden (1983), known as Legend of the Eight Samurai, a martial arts fantasy film
 The Hakkenden (1990–1995), an anime OVA series by Anime International Company
 Idol Hakkenden (1989), a Japanese text adventure video game
 Shin Hakkenden (1999), a Japanese anime series
 Hakkenden: Eight Dogs of the East (Hakkenden: Tōhō Hakken Ibun), a 2005 manga and 2013 Japanese anime series adaptation